Tied & True is the fourth album by The Detroit Cobras, released 24 April 2007.

Track listing

As Long as I Have You
 Original by Garnett Mimms
Nothing but a Heartache
 Original by The Flirtations
(If You Don't Think) You Better Change
 Original by Tammy Montgomery
Leave My Kitten Alone
 Original by Little Willie John
(I Wanna Know) What's Going On
Original by Art Neville
Try Love
Original by Dori Grayson
You'll Never Change
Original by Betty Lavett
Puppet on a String
 Original by Gino Washington
Only To Other People
 Original by The Cookies
The Hurt's All Gone
 Original by Irma Thomas
It's My Delight
 Original by The Melodians
On a Monday
 Original by Lead Belly
Green Light
 Original by The Equals

Personnel
Rachel Nagy	 - 	Lead Vocals/Piano
Maribel (Mary) Restrepo	 - 	Guitar
Kenny Tudrick	 - 	Drums/Guitar
Greg Cartwright	 - 	Guitar/Percussion
Carol Schumacher	 - 	Bass guitar

Also featuring:
Eddie Hawrysch - Additional Piano
Ryan Pritts - Timpanies and Additional Backing Vocals on "Green Light"
Ko Shih - Additional Bass
Jeliana Frelitz - Additional Backing Vocals on "Green Light"
Melissa Glush - Additional Backing Vocals on "Green Light"

2007 albums
The Detroit Cobras albums
Bloodshot Records albums